Chaharsu Poshteh (also Romanized as Chahārsū Poshteh) is a village in Lat Leyl Rural District, Otaqvar District, Langarud County, Gilan Province, Iran. At the 2006 census, its population was 75, in 22 families.

References 

Populated places in Langarud County